"Turned Away" is a 1989 debut single by singer/songwriter Chuckii Booker. The single went to number one the Billboard R&B singles chart for one week and peaked at number forty-two on the Hot 100.

Charts

Weekly charts

Year-end charts

References

1989 debut singles
1989 songs
Atlantic Records singles
Chuckii Booker songs
New jack swing songs
Songs written by Chuckii Booker